Herbert Richter (born 26 April 1947) is a retired East German track cyclist. He had his best achievements in the 4000m team pursuit event, winning silver medals at the world championships in 1970 and 1971 and at the 1972 Summer Olympics.

References 

1947 births
Living people
East German male cyclists
Sportspeople from Chemnitz
Olympic cyclists of East Germany
Cyclists at the 1972 Summer Olympics
Olympic silver medalists for East Germany
Olympic medalists in cycling
Medalists at the 1972 Summer Olympics
Cyclists from Saxony
People from Bezirk Karl-Marx-Stadt